Mačkovac is a village in the municipality of Kruševac, Serbia. According to the 2002 census, the village has a population of  1295 people.

One of the landmarks of the village, is Saint Petka Ortodhox Church.

References

Populated places in Rasina District